Plager is a surname. Notable people with the surname include:

Barclay Plager (1941–1988), Canadian ice hockey defenceman
Bill Plager (1945–2016), Canadian ice hockey defenceman
Bob Plager (1943–2021), Canadian ice hockey defenceman
S. Jay Plager (born 1931), Senior United States Circuit Judge of the United States Court of Appeals for the Federal Circuit